Sir Robert Andrew Burns  (born 21 July 1943) is a former diplomat in the British Foreign and Commonwealth Office.

Early life
Sir Andrew was born on 21 July 1943 and educated at Highgate School. He graduated from Trinity College, Cambridge with a Master of Arts (MA).

Diplomatic career
Sir Andrew served with the Diplomatic Service between 1965 and 2003, beginning his career as an Urdu and Hindi speaker at the British High Commission in New Delhi in the 1960s. Serving in New Delhi between 1967 and 1971, the later returned to London where he served as the United Kingdom's Delegate to the Conference for Security and Co-operation in Europe between 1975 and 1981. He later became Head of South Asia Department between 1986 and 1988.

He held the office of Ambassador to Israel between 1992 and 1995. He was later appointed as British Consul-General to Hong Kong and Macau, serving between 1997 and 2000. He then became British High Commissioner to Canada, serving from 2000 to 2003.

Subsequent career
In June 2005 Sir Andrew was appointed to the BBC's Board of Governors as International Governor, replacing Dame Pauline Neville-Jones.

In June 2010 he was appointed the United Kingdom's first Envoy for post-Holocaust issues. He held this post until September 2015. He was succeeded in the role by Sir Eric Pickles.

He was Chair of Council of Royal Holloway, a constituent college of the University of London. He was appointed to succeed Lady Deech as the chair of the Bar Standards Board from 1 January 2015.

Sir Andrew was also previously Chairman of the China Association between 2008 and 2014 and is a Fellow of the Royal Society for the encouragement of Arts, Manufactures & Commerce (RSA).

References

External links
 (Robert) Andrew BURNS, Debrett's People of Today

1943 births
High Commissioners of the United Kingdom to Canada
Living people
Knights Commander of the Order of St Michael and St George
People educated at Highgate School
People associated with Royal Holloway, University of London
Ambassadors of the United Kingdom to Israel
Consuls-General of the United Kingdom in Hong Kong